Tyco R/C: Assault With a Battery is a PlayStation game that shipped in September 2000. The game was based on the Tyco Toys R/C brand radio-controlled cars and features, and hence has titles from real R/C cars by Tyco. The game was developed by Lucky Chicken Games and published by Mattel Interactive. It received some acclaim from online game review sources, but was lost at retail during Mattel's exit of the Video Games business as a result of their failed acquisition of The Learning Company.

The name of the game is a play on words of two types of crimes, Assault and Battery.

Vehicles
 Hot Rocker (Hot Rod)
 Speed Wrench (Pickup Truck)
 Tantrum (Dune Buggy)
 Mini Rebound 4x4
 Nitro Dozer
 Recoil (Monster Truck)
 Super Rebound 4X4

Reception

The game received average reviews according to the review aggregation website GameRankings. Emmett Schkloven of NextGen said that the game was "Neither a monster nor a must-have, but a quick and entertaining diversion nonetheless." In Japan, where the game was ported and published by Syscom as part of the World Greatest Hits Series on June 13, 2002, Famitsu gave it a score of 23 out of 40.

Notes

References

External links
 

2000 video games
Mattel video games
PlayStation (console) games
PlayStation (console)-only games
PlayStation Network games
Video games based on Mattel toys
Video games developed in the United States
Lucky Chicken Games games
Multiplayer and single-player video games